Emily Ann Carter (born November 28, 1960, in Los Gatos, California) is the Gerhard R. Andlinger Professor in Energy and the Environment and a professor of Mechanical and Aerospace Engineering, the Andlinger Center for Energy and the Environment, and the Program in Applied and Computational Mathematics at Princeton University. She has been on the faculty at Princeton since 2004, including as serving as Princeton's Dean of the School of Engineering and Applied Science from 2016 to 2019. She moved to UCLA to serve as Executive Vice Chancellor and Provost and a distinguished professor of chemical and biomolecular engineering, before returning to Princeton in December 2021. Carter is a theorist and computational scientist whose work combines quantum mechanics, solid-state physics, and applied mathematics.

Education and career
Carter received a Bachelor of Science in chemistry from the University of California, Berkeley, in 1982. She was awarded her Ph.D. in physical chemistry in 1987 from the California Institute of Technology, where she worked with William Andrew Goddard III, studying homogeneous and heterogeneous catalysis.

Carter held a postdoctoral position at the University of Colorado, Boulder, during the 1987–1988 academic year. There she worked with James T. Hynes carrying out studies on the dynamics of (photo-induced) electron transfer in solution and also with Hynes, Giovanni Ciccotti, and Ray Kapral to develop the widely used Blue Moon ensemble, a rare event sampling method for condensed matter simulations.

From 1988 to 2004, Carter held professorships in Chemistry and Materials Science and Engineering at the University of California, Los Angeles. During those years, she was the Dr. Lee's visiting research fellow in the Sciences at Christ Church, Oxford (1996), a visiting scholar in the Department of Physics at Harvard University (1999), and a visiting associate in Aeronautics at the California Institute of Technology (2001). She moved to Princeton University in 2004 as Professor of Mechanical and Aerospace Engineering and Applied and Computational Mathematics. In 2006, she was named Arthur W. Marks ’19 Professor. From 2009–2014, she was co-director of the Department of Energy Frontier Research Center on Combustion Science. She became the founding director of the Andlinger Center for Energy and the Environment in 2010, Gerhard R. Andlinger Professor in 2011, and dean of the School of Engineering and Applied Science in 2016.

From 2016 to 2019, Carter was dean of the Princeton University School of Engineering and Applied Science and the Gerhard R. Andlinger Professor in Energy and the Environment, as well as a professor in the Department of Mechanical and Aerospace Engineering and the Program in Applied and Computational Mathematics at Princeton University. She was an associated faculty member in the Andlinger Center for Energy and the Environment, the Department of Chemistry, the Department of Chemical and Biological Engineering, the Princeton Institute for Computational Science and Engineering (PICSciE), the Princeton Environmental Institute (PEI), and the Princeton Institute for the Science and Technology of Materials (PRISM). She was the founding director of the Andlinger Center for Energy and the Environment from 2010–2016. In 2019, she began serving as the executive vice chancellor and provost and a distinguished professor of chemical and biomolecular engineering at UCLA. She returned to Princeton in 2021, where she took on the newly created role of senior strategic advisor for sustainability science at the Princeton Plasma Physics Laboratory (PPPL), a U.S. Department of Energy national laboratory at Princeton.

Carter was elected as a member into the National Academy of Engineering (2016) for the development of quantum chemistry computational methods for the design of molecules and materials for sustainable energy.

Research

Carter has made significant contributions to theoretical and computational chemistry and physics. She has developed ab initio quantum chemistry methods and applied them to the study of materials. Early contributions included methods for accurate description of molecules at the quantum level and an algorithm for identifying transitional states in chemical reactions. She pioneered the combination of ab initio quantum chemistry with kinetic Monte Carlo simulations (KMC), molecular dynamics (MD), and quasicontinuum solid mechanics simulations relevant to the study of surfaces and interfaces of materials.  She has studied the chemical and mechanical causes and mechanisms of failure in materials such as silicon, germanium, iron and steel. She has also proposed methods for protecting materials from failure.

Carter has developed fast methods for orbital-free density functional theory (OF-DFT) that can be applied to large numbers of atoms. She has also developed embedded correlated wavefunction theory for the study of local condensed matter electronic structure. This work has relevance to the understanding of photoelectrocatalysis.

Carter's current research focuses on the understanding and design of materials for sustainable energy.  Applications include conversion of sunlight to electricity, clean and efficient use of biofuels and solid oxide fuel cells, and development of materials for use in fuel-efficient vehicles and fusion reactors.

Awards
Carter's scholarly work has been recognized by a number of national and international awards and honors from a variety of entities, including the following:
 Joseph O. Hirschfelder Prize in Theoretical Chemistry, 2015-2016 (the first woman to receive this award), 
 Remsen Award from the ACS Maryland Section, 2014 
 ACS Award for Computers in Chemical and Pharmaceutical Research, 2007 (also the first woman to receive this award)
 Irving Langmuir Award in Chemical Physics, 2017
Carter is a member of the American Academy of Arts and Sciences (2008), the American Association for the Advancement of Science, the American Physical Society, the American Vacuum Society (1995), the International Academy of Quantum Molecular Science (2009), the National Academy of Inventors (2014), the National Academy of Sciences (2008), and the National Academy of Engineering (2016). She is a fellow of the American Chemical Society.

References

1960 births
Living people
21st-century American chemists
California Institute of Technology alumni
Computational chemists
Princeton University faculty
Theoretical chemists
UC Berkeley College of Chemistry alumni
American women chemists
American women academics
21st-century American women scientists